Aama is a 2020 Nepali drama film, directed and written by Dipendra K. Khanal. The film is produced by Sharmila Pandey under the banner of DS Digital. The film stars Mithila Sharma, Surakshya Panta in the lead roles and alongside Sarita Giri, Deshbhakta Khanal, Manish Niraula, Laxmi Bhusal, Tika Pahari, Padam Prasad Poudel, Aashant Sharma, Saroj Aryal. The film is about relationship of mother and daughter. The film generally received positive feedback from the critics.

Plot 
Yagya Prasad Aryal (Desh Bhakta Khanal) is in an incident which caused a serious head injury. His wife admits him to a hospital in Kathmandu. In Kathmandu, she only has her daughter Arati (Surakshya Panta) and her husband (Manish Niraula). Yagya Prasad goes through an expensive surgery. Arati's brother cannot come to Kathmandu since he is in the United States, now she has to take care of her father and mother.

Cast 

 Mithila Sharma as Aama
 Surakshya Panta as Arati 
 Sarita Giri as a mother of a newborn baby
 Deshbhakta Khanal as Yagya Prasad Aryal / father
 Manish Niraula as Arati's husband
 Laxmi Bhusal as grandmother
 Tika Pahari
 Arpan Thapa as Arati's elder brother (voice)
 Padam Prasad Poudel
 Aashant Sharma
 Saroj Aryal

Production 
Actress Surakshya Panta agreed to shave her head for the role.

Release and reception 
Sunny Mahat of The Annapurna Express said that Aama is a must-watch, he elaborated  "Aama breaks norms, dismantles stereotypes and proves there are mature filmmakers and artists in the industry. It's a story without theatrical augmentations that we call can relate to". Diwakar Pyakurel of Online Khabar praised Surakshya Panta writing, "Panta has done an excellent job; she looks natural in her emotionally-turbulent role. This project has elevated her one step up in her career". The staff of Moviemanu wrote, "The movie is not for someone who seeks a lighthearted entertainment in the theater. The movie doesn't break any ground or directs towards any resolution to the alarming situation of our health sector. However, if you are in a different emotional mood, you won't be disappointed. However, don't jump in by looking merely at the title". Gokarna Gautam of Kantipur praised the actress Panta for her acting.

References

External links 

 

2020 drama films
2020 films
Nepalese drama films
Films about death
Films shot in Kathmandu
Cultural depictions of Nepalese women